Ahad Kazemi Sarai (born 21 May 1975) is an Iranian cyclist, who is currently suspended from the sport due to an anti-doping rules violation.

He competed in the road race at the 2000 Summer Olympics, but failed to finish.

Doping
Kazemi is currently serving an eight-year ban for an ADRV for testosterone from a sample taken at the 2016 Tour of Iran.

Major results

1998
 1st  Overall Tour of Azerbaijan
1999
 1st  Overall Tour of Azerbaijan
2000
 1st Stage 7 Presidential Cycling Tour of Turkey
 3rd Overall Tour of Azerbaijan
2001
 1st  Overall Tour of Azerbaijan
 National Road Championships
2nd Time trial
3rd Road race
 4th Overall Tour of Saudi Arabia
2002
 2nd  Road race, Asian Road Championships
2003
 1st  Overall Tour of Azerbaijan
2004
 1st  Overall Presidential Cycling Tour of Turkey
2005
 1st  Overall Tour de East Java
1st Mountains classification
1st Stage 2
 1st  Overall Tour de Taiwan
1st Stage 4
 1st Stage 6 Milad De Nour Tour
 2nd Overall Tour of Azerbaijan (Iran)
 6th Overall Kerman Tour
2006
 1st  Road race, National Road Championships
 1st Stage 5 (TTT) Milad De Nour Tour
 2nd Overall Tour of Azerbaijan (Iran)
1st Prologue
 3rd Overall 2005–06 UCI Asia Tour
 3rd Overall Kerman Tour
 4th Overall Tour de East Java
 6th Road race, Asian Road Championships
2007
 1st  Overall Tour of Thailand
1st Stage 4
 1st  Overall Tour of Islamabad
 2nd Road race, National Road Championships
 2nd Overall Milad De Nour Tour
1st Stage 4
 5th Overall Tour of Azerbaijan (Iran)
1st Stages 3 & 8
 6th Overall Kerman Tour
 6th Overall Presidential Cycling Tour of Turkey
2008
 1st  Overall International Presidency Tour
1st Stage 4
 1st  Overall Milad De Nour Tour
1st Stage 2
 2nd Road race, National Road Championships
 2nd Overall Tour de East Java
 3rd Overall Tour of Azerbaijan (Iran)
1st Stage 2 (TTT)
2009
 1st  Overall Tour of Azerbaijan (Iran)
1st Stage 2
 1st Stage 1 (TTT) Tour de Indonesia
2015
 2nd Road race, National Road Championships
 2nd Overall Tour of Fuzhou
1st Stage 2
 4th Overall Tour de Singkarak
1st Stage 8
 8th Overall Tour de Filipinas
2016
2nd Overall Tour of Iran (Azerbaijan)
 4th Road race, National Road Championships
5th Overall Tour of Fuzhou

References

External links

1975 births
Living people
Iranian male cyclists
Tour of Azerbaijan (Iran) winners
Cyclists at the 2000 Summer Olympics
Olympic cyclists of Iran
Cyclists at the 1998 Asian Games
Cyclists at the 2002 Asian Games
Asian Games competitors for Iran
Doping cases in cycling
21st-century Iranian people